Sammy Sheik (Arabic: سامي كامل الشيخ; born November 15, 1981) is an Egyptian-American actor. Sheik is best known for playing the role of "Mustafa" in Clint Eastwood’s American Sniper.

Career
Sheik was cast to play Al Jazeera executive, Mukhtar Al-Mujib in Mr. Brooks' feature film, Looking for Comedy in the Muslim World. Soon thereafter, he started landing roles in TV series. He played a calculating hooded eyed killer, Mohamed El-Razani on the FX series, Over There, ring leader, Masheer Abu Marzuq on Fox's 24, which led to the role of Jamal Bin Mohamed on 24's spinoff show The Rookie. He also played a hot blooded bedouin, Kamal on ABC's Lost, and made guest appearances on NCIS, The Unit, My Own Worst Enemy and In the Moment. He played the recurring role Hany on the Showtime's United States of Tara.

Personal life 
Sheik splits his time between Cairo and Los Angeles.

Filmography

External links
 
AmericanEast Biographies
people.theiapolis.com

References 

1981 births
Living people
21st-century American male actors
American people of Egyptian descent
Egyptian emigrants to the United States
Egyptian male film actors
Egyptian male television actors